Bangladesh Railway Class 2900 is, as of 2017, the most frequently used meter-gauge diesel electric locomotive of Bangladesh Railway. This reliable locomotive series has been in service since 1999. Bangladesh Railway has a total 39 locomotives of this class. These 39 locomotives are being used in both passenger and freight services.

Builders details 

Class 2900 locomotives are mainly built by Hyundai Rotem of South Korea under License of EMD. These 39 locomotives came to Bangladesh in 4 phases. They are-
 Year 1999 = 2901-2908
 Year 2004 = 2909-2919
 Year 2011 = 2920-2928
 Year 2013 = 2929-2939

Technical details 

Bangladesh Railway Class 2900 is a 1500 hp locomotive. The Electro Motive Division export model of this locomotive is GT18L-2. The wheel arrangement of this locomotive is A1A-A1A. Class 2900 locomotives have a similar specification to Bangladesh Railway Class 2600 locomotives.

Bangladesh Railway specification of this locomotive is 'M.E.I -15'. Here - M stands for meter-gauge, E Stands for diesel electric, I stands for Hyundai Rotem and 15 stands for locomotive horsepower (x100).

Usage 

The Class 2900 locomotive can be used both for passenger services and freight services. It is highly recommended for prominent Bangladeshi trains like Subarna Express, Sonarbangla Express, Parabat Express etc. Long-distance trains like Lalmoni Express always run with Class 2900 locomotives.

The Class 2900 locomotive is considered efficient for freight services as well. It pulls containers, oil tankers and other departmental freight trains regularly across the country.

Maintenance 
Class 2900 Locomotives are maintained in the following workshops :

Central Locomotive Workshop (CLW) at Parbatipur, Dinajpur.
Diesel Workshop at Pahartali, Chittagong.

Accidents and incidents
Locomotive no. 2933 was one of the newest locomotives of Class 2900 which met a fatal accident in Noyapara upazila, Habiganj district on 7 October 2016. The locomotive caught fire soon after it derailed with the Parabat Express near Noapara rail station. The driver's cab and electrical cabinet of the locomotive were completely destroyed in the fire. As of December 2019, this locomotive is awaiting heavy repair.

Locomotive 2923 was hauling the Turna Nishita passenger train which overran a red signal and collided head-on with the Udayan Express at Mondobhag railway station, Kasba on 12 November 2019. Sixteen people were killed and over 100 were injured. As of December 2019, Locomotive 2923 has been repaired and has rejoined the locomotive fleet in service.

See also
 Transport in Bangladesh
 Kalni Express
 Bangladesh Railway Class 2000
 Bangladesh Railway Class 2600
 Bangladesh Railway Class 2700

References

Locomotives of Bangladesh
A1A-A1A locomotives
Railway locomotives introduced in 1999
Metre gauge diesel locomotives